"Paper Rosie" is a song written and originally recorded by Canadian country music artist Dallas Harms. Harms' version peaked at number 21 on the RPM Country Tracks chart in 1975.

The song was later covered by American country music artist Gene Watson. Watson's version released on January 22, 1977 as the first (and only) single and from his album Paper Rosie. Watson's version peaked at No. 3 on the Billboard Hot Country Singles chart in the spring of 1977. It stayed at No. 3 for a total of 3 weeks of the 17 weeks it was on the chart. It also reached number 1 on the RPM Country Tracks chart in Canada.

Content
The song is set at a roadside tavern and is told from the viewpoint of a young man who buys a paper rose from an elderly female vendor. Shortly thereafter, he hears the ringing of church bells and choir voices and realizes a funeral is taking place nearby. When he hears the choir singing "Paper Rosie," he realizes that the funeral is for the woman who'd just sold him the rose. The song suggests that it was actually the spirit of the woman who sold him the paper flower.

Chart performance

Dallas Harms

Gene Watson

Year-end charts

References

1975 singles
1977 singles
1975 songs
Dallas Harms songs
Gene Watson songs
Capitol Records singles